Clifford Brittin Wilson (December 2, 1879 – January 1, 1943) was an American politician who was the 76th lieutenant governor of Connecticut from 1915 to 1921 and a mayor of Bridgeport, Connecticut.

Early life
Clifford B. Wilson was born in Bridgeport, Fairfield County, Connecticut, December 2, 1879. His parents were James A. Wilson and Mary E. (Wordin) Wilson. He was a lawyer. On November 10, 1914, he married Anastasia C. Dorsey.

Political career
Wilson was a Republican. He was elected mayor of Bridgeport in 1911 and continued until 1921, after losing an election. He was also elected Lieutenant Governor of Connecticut in November 1914. He served as lieutenant governor for three consecutive two-year terms, from January 6, 1915 to January 5, 1921, for the whole time that Marcus H. Holcomb was the governor of the state.

He tried to become mayor of Bridgeport again in 1935, but lost.

Later years
Wilson died from a heart attack, in Weston, Fairfield County, Connecticut, January 1, 1943.

See also
 List of governors of Connecticut

References

1879 births
1943 deaths
Connecticut lawyers
Connecticut Republicans
Mayors of Bridgeport, Connecticut
Lieutenant Governors of Connecticut